The Fort William Curling Club is a curling club located in the Downtown Fort William neighbourhood of Thunder Bay, Ontario. The club hosted the Canadian men's curling championship in 1960 and the Canadian women's curling championship in 1969. It is also the home club of World Men's curling champions Al Hackner, Rick Lang, Bob Nicol, Bruce Kennedy, Ian Tetley, and Pat Perroud.

History
The Fort William Curling Club was established in Fort William (now Thunder Bay) on September 18, 1891, on property leased by Peter and John McKellar. It was originally part of the Manitoba Curling Association. The rink was destroyed by fire twice, in 1892 and 1908. The current facility, with artificial ice, opened on March 10, 1951, as the Fort William Curling and Athletic Club. The club is adjacent to the Fort William Gardens.

Notable members
Only events representing the Fort William Curling Club are listed.
John McKellar – Mayor of Fort William (1892–1898)
Robert Pow – 1932 Olympic champion; mayor of Fort William (1933–1936)
Tom Tod – 1958 Canadian Schoolboys champion; 1970 Macdonald Brier participant
Neil McLeod – 1958 Canadian Schoolboys champion
Patrick Moran – 1958 Canadian Schoolboys champion
David Allin – 1958 Canadian Schoolboys champion
Darwin Wark – 1959 Macdonald Brier participant
Dennis Stephen – 1959 Macdonald Brier participant
Leslie Sutton – 1959 Macdonald Brier participant
John Jones – 1959 Macdonald Brier participant
James Carson – 1970 Macdonald Brier participant
J. Carl Whitfield – 1970 Macdonald Brier participant
Bill Hallinan – 1970 Macdonald Brier participant
Bill Tetley – 1975 Macdonald Brier champion; 1975 World Men's bronze medallist
Rick Lang – 1975 Macdonald Brier, 1982, and 1985 Labatt Brier champion; 1975 World Men's bronze medallist; 1976 Macdonald Brier, 1988, 1991, and 1995 Labatt Brier participant; 1980 and 1981 Labatt Brier runner-up; 1981 Canadian Mixed champion; 1982 and 1985 World Men's champion; 1993 Labatt Brier bronze medallist; 2006 Canadian Senior champion; 2007 World Senior silver medallist
Bill Hodgson, Jr. – 1975 Macdonald Brier champion; 1975 World Men's bronze medallist
Peter Hnatiw – 1975 Macdonald Brier champion; 1975 World Men's bronze medallist
Bob Nicol – 1976 Macdonald Brier participant; 1980 and 1981 Labatt Brier runner-up; 1982 Labatt Brier champion; 1982 World Men's champion
Al Fiskar, Jr. – 1976 Macdonald Brier participant
Warren Butters – 1976 Macdonald Brier participant
Al Hackner – 1980 and 1981 Labatt Brier runner-up; 1982 and 1985 Labatt Brier champion; 1982 and 1985 World Men's champion; 1988, 1989, 1995 Labatt Brier, and 2001 Nokia Brier participant; 2006 Canadian Senior champion; 2007 World Senior silver medallist
Bruce Kennedy – 1980 and 1981 Labatt Brier runner-up; 1982 Labatt Brier champion; 1982 World Men's champion; 1987 Labatt Brier participant
Anne Provo – 1981 Canadian Mixed champion; 1983 Scott Tournament of Hearts participant
Bert Provo – 1981 Canadian Mixed champion
Lorraine Lang – 1981 Canadian Mixed champion; 1983, 2006 Scott Tournament of Hearts, 2007, and 2009 Scotties Tournament of Hearts participant; 1991 Scott Tournament of Hearts bronze medallist; 2009 Canadian Olympic Curling Trials bronze medallist
Marlene Delorenzi – 1983 Scott Tournament of Hearts participant
Valerie Adams – 1983 Scott Tournament of Hearts participant
Ian Tetley – 1985 Labatt Brier champion; 1985 World Men's champion
Pat Perroud – 1985 Labatt Brier champion; 1985 World Men's champion
Larry Pineau – 1987 Labatt Brier participant
Jack Kallos – 1987 Labatt Brier participant
Brian Snell – 1987 Labatt Brier participant
Jim Adams – 1988 and 1989 Labatt Brier participant
Doug Smith – 1988 Labatt Brier participant
Bill Adams – 1989 Labatt Brier participant
John Salo – 1989 Labatt Brier participant
Jason Repay – 1991 Canadian Junior champion; 1992 World Junior bronze medallist
Aaron Skillen – 1991 Canadian Junior champion; 1992 World Junior bronze medallist; 1995 Labatt Brier participant
Scott McCallum – 1991 Canadian Junior champion; 1992 World Junior bronze medallist
Trevor Clifford – 1991 Canadian Junior champion; 1992 World Junior bronze medallist
Heather Houston – 1991 Scott Tournament of Hearts bronze medallist
Diane Adams – 1991 Scott Tournament of Hearts bronze medallist
Diane Pushkar – 1991 Scott Tournament of Hearts bronze medallist
Scott Henderson – 1991 Labatt Brier and 2003 Nokia Brier participant; 1993 Labatt Brier bronze medallist
Ross Tetley – 1991 Labatt Brier participant; 1993 Labatt Brier bronze medallist
Art Lappalainen – 1991, 1995 Labatt Brier, and 2003 Nokia Brier participant; 1993 Labatt Brier bronze medallist
Bryan Burgess – 2001 Nokia Brier participant
Joe Scharf – 2001 Nokia Brier participant
Mike Assad – 2001 Nokia Brier participant
Mike Desilets – 2003 Nokia Brier participant
Tim Lindsay – 2003 Nokia Brier participant
Krista McCarville – 2006 Scott Tournament of Hearts, 2007, 2009, 2017, 2019, and 2020 Scotties Tournament of Hearts participant; 2010 Scotties Tournament of Hearts bronze medallist; 2009 Canadian Olympic Curling Trials bronze medallist; 2010 Canada Cup participant; 2016 Scotties Tournament of Hearts silver medallist; 2017 Canadian Olympic Curling Trials participant
Tara George – 2006 Scott Tournament of Hearts, 2007, and 2009 Scotties Tournament of Hearts participant; 2009 Canadian Olympic Curling Trials bronze medallist; 2010 Scotties Tournament of Hearts bronze medallist
Tiffany Stubbings – 2006 Scott Tournament of Hearts and 2007 Scotties Tournament of Hearts participant
Al Laine – 2006 Canadian Senior champion; 2007 World Senior silver medallist
Brian Adams – 2006 Canadian Senior champion; 2007 World Senior silver medallist
Dylan Johnston – 2009 Canadian Junior silver medallist
Cody Johnston – 2009 Canadian Junior silver medallist
Michael Makela – 2009 Canadian Junior silver medallist
Mike Badiuk – 2009 Canadian Junior silver medallist
Kari Lavoie – 2009 Scotties Tournament of Hearts participant; 2009 Canadian Olympic Curling Trials bronze medallist; 2010 Scotties Tournament of Hearts bronze medallist; 2010 Canada Cup participant
Ashley Sippala – 2010 Scotties Tournament of Hearts bronze medallist; 2010 Canada Cup participant; 2016 Scotties Tournament of Hearts silver medallist; 2017 and 2020 Scotties Tournament of Hearts participant; 2017 Canadian Olympic Curling Trials participant
Sarah Potts – 2010 Canada Cup participant; 2016 Scotties Tournament of Hearts silver medallist; 2017 and 2019 Scotties Tournament of Hearts participant; 2017 Canadian Olympic Curling Trials participant
Jeff Currie – 2014 Tim Hortons Brier participant
Mike McCarville – 2014 Tim Hortons Brier participant
Colin Koivula – 2014 Tim Hortons Brier participant
Jamie Childs – 2014 Tim Hortons Brier participant

Events
The Fort William Curling Club has hosted several Canadian national curling championships. In 1960, the club co-hosted the Macdonald Brier, the Canadian men's curling championship, at the Fort William Gardens. The club also hosted the 1966 Canadian Mixed Curling Championship and the Canadian Ladies Curling Association Championship in 1969. In 2006, the Fort William and Port Arthur Curling Clubs co-hosted the Canadian Junior Curling Championships in Thunder Bay. The Fort William Curling Club also hosted the Canadian Wheelchair Curling Championship in 2012, where a team from the club, skipped by Carl Levesque, represented Northern Ontario. The following year, the club hosted the 2013 The Dominion Curling Club Championship, the Canadian championships for club-level curlers. In 2017, the club hosted the U Sports/Curling Canada University Curling Championships.

The club has also hosted several Northern Ontario provincial curling championships. It hosted the men's provincial championship in 2011 and in 2017. The club also hosted the 2015 Northern Ontario Scotties Tournament of Hearts, which was the first time that the Northern Ontario women's provincial champions received a direct berth into the national Scotties Tournament of Hearts and represented Northern Ontario separately from Ontario.

Provincial champions

Presidents

Notes

References

External links
Website

Curling clubs in Canada
Sports venues in Thunder Bay
1891 establishments in Ontario